The 2009 KNSB Dutch Allround Championships in speed skating were held at the Thialf ice stadium in Heerenveen, Netherlands on 27 and 28 December 2008. The championships were part of the 2008–09 speed skating season.

The men's and women's winners, Ireen Wüst and Sven Kramer both prolonged their title.

Schedule

Medalists

Allround

Distance

Men's results

Source men: Schaatsstatistieken.nl

Women's results

Source women: Schaatsstatistieken.nl

References

KNSB Dutch Allround Championships
KNSB Dutch Allround Championships
2009 Allround
KNSB Dutch Allround Championships, 2009